Central Asian Arabic or Jugari Arabic (in Arabic: العربية الآسيوية الوسطى) is a variety of Arabic currently facing extinction and spoken predominantly by Arab communities living in portions of Central Asia.

It is a very different variant from others known in the Arabic language and, although it bears certain similarities with North Mesopotamian Arabic, it is part of the Central Asian family, an independent linguistic branch of the five mainly groups of the Modern Standard Arabic. There is no diglossia with Modern Standard Arabic.

It is spoken by an estimated 6,000 people in Afghanistan, Iran, Tajikistan, and Uzbekistan, countries where Arabic is not an official language, and reported to be declining in number.

In contrast to all Arab countries, it is not characterized by diglossia; The Arab ethnic group use Uzbek and Persian (including Dari and Tajiki) to communicate with each other, and as literary language; Speakers are reported to be bilingual, others speak these languages as mother tongue, and only few members of the communities now speak Jugari Arabic.

History

It was once spoken among Central Asia's numerous settled and nomadic Arab communities who moved there after the fall of Sasanian Empire. They inhabited areas in Samarqand, Bukhara, Qashqadarya, Surkhandarya (present-day Uzbekistan), and Khatlon (present-day Tajikistan), as well as Afghanistan. The first wave of Arabs migrated to this region in the 8th century during the Muslim conquests and was later joined by groups of Arabs from Balkh and Andkhoy (present-day Afghanistan). According to İbn Al-Athir, the Arabic conquerors settled about 50,000 Arabic families in to Iranian Khorasan, modern day Northern Afghanistan and southern Turkmenistan, but the number is definitely exaggerated. Owing to heavy Islamic influences, Arabic quickly became the common language of science and literature of the epoch. Most Central Asian Arabs lived in isolated communities and did not favour intermarriages with the local population. This factor helped their language survive in a multilingual milieu until the 20th century. By the 1880s many Arab pastoralists had migrated to northern Afghanistan from what is now Uzbekistan and Tajikistan following the Russian conquest of Central Asia. These Arabs nowadays speak no Arabic having adapted to Dari and Uzbek.

With the establishment of the Soviet rule in Uzbekistan and Tajikistan, Arab communities faced major linguistic and identity changes having had to abandon nomadic lifestyles and gradually mixing with Uzbeks, Tajiks and Turkmen. According to the 1959 census, only 34% of Soviet Arabs, mostly elderly, spoke their language at a native level. Others reported Uzbek or Tajik as their mother tongue.

Varieties
Giorgi Tsereteli and Isaak Natanovich Vinnikov were responsible for the first academic studies of Central Asian Arabic, which is heavily influenced by the local languages in phonetics, vocabulary and syntax.

The Jugari Arabic comprises four varieties: Bakhtiari Arabic (also called Bactrian Arabic), Bukhara Arabic (also called Buxara Arabic), Kashkadarya Arabic and Khorasani Arabic. The first three have their speakers spread across Afghanistan, Tajikistan and Uzbekistan. Khorasani came to be considered by scholars as part of the Central Asian Arabic dialect family only recently.

It is reported to be spoken in 5 villages of Surkhandarya, Qashqadarya and Bukhara. In Uzbekistan, there are at least two dialects of Central Asian Arabic: Bukharian (influenced by Tajik) and Qashqadaryavi (influenced by Turkic languages). These dialects are not mutually intelligible. In Tajikistan, Central Asian Arabic is spoken by 35.7% of the country's Arab population, having been largely replaced by Tajik. Bakhtiari Arabic is spoken in Arab communities in northern Afghanistan. Recent studies considered Khorasani Arabic (spoken in Khorasan, Iran) as part of the Central Asian Arabic family, and found that it was closely related to Qashqadaryavi.

Numbers
 wahid > fad
 ithnaân > isnen
 thalatha > salaâs
 arba3a > orba3

See also
History of Arabs in Afghanistan
Khoja
:ru:Среднеазиатские арабы - central Asian Arabs

References

Bibliography 
 Versteegh, Kees. The Arabic Language. — Edinburgh University Press, 2014. — 410 p. — .

Arabic languages
Mashriqi Arabic
Languages of Afghanistan
Languages of Uzbekistan
Languages of Tajikistan
Languages of Iran